The Archdeacon of Galloway was the only archdeacon in the medieval Diocese of Galloway (Whithorn), acting as a deputy of the Bishop of Galloway. The following is a list of archdeacons:

List of archdeacons of Galloway
 Robert, fl. 1154 x 1186
 John, fl. 1186 x 1222
 Michael, fl. 1235 x 1253
 Geoffrey, 1254-1294
 John Nepos, 1294-1294
 Gilbert de Galloway (Galwidia), fl. 1320 x 1321
 Patrick Macdowell, x 1331-1360
 Stephen de Makerstoun (Malcarston), fl. x 1367.
 Duncan Petit, fl. 1363 
 Richard Smerles fl. x 1391.
 Thomas de Buittle, 1391 - 1415.
 Gilbert Cavan, 1415-1415 x 1417.
 John Gray, 1415 x 1417-1425
 Patrick Young, 1423-1471
 David de Hamilton, 1425
 John Betoun, 1427-1428
 John Benyng, 1430
 Thomas Spens, x 1450
 John Otterburn, 1471-1478
 George Brown,  1477-1478
 Andrew Stewart, 1502-1507
 Walter Betoun, 1507
 Thomas Nudry, 1509-1510 x 1512.
 Alexander Shaw, 1512-1513
 Henry Wemyss, 1513 x 1522-1531
 Patrick Arnot, 1529-1543
 Thomas Hay, 1531
 Lyon Brown, 1576-1577
 James Adamson, 1614-1637

Bibliography
 Watt, D.E.R., Fasti Ecclesiae Scotinanae Medii Aevi ad annum 1638, 2nd Draft, (St Andrews, 1969), pp. 136-8

See also
 Bishop of Galloway

Galloway
History of Galloway
Christianity in Dumfries and Galloway